Anjela Nedyalkova (born March 2, 1991) is a Bulgarian actress.

Education
Nedyalkova went to the National Academy for Theatre and Film Arts in Sofia to study film directing, but dropped out. She began her acting career in 2009.

Career
In 2011, she took on the title role of the young hitchhiker Avé in the Bulgarian film Ave. In 2014, she played Shelli in the film Bulgarian Rhapsody. In 2014, she played a young model lured into prostitution in the Dutch film The Paradise Suite. In 2017, she played the part of Veronika, Sick Boy's girlfriend, in the feature film T2 Trainspotting.

Filmography

Awards 
 Sofia International Film Festival 
2016: Special Mention for The Paradise Suite 

SUBTITLE European Film Festival
2015: Angela Award for Best Actress for The Paradise Suite

References

External links 

 
 

Bulgarian actresses
Living people
1991 births
Bulgarian film actresses
People from Sofia